In Greek mythology, Pallas (/ˈpæləs/; Ancient Greek: for male Πάλλας, gen. Πάλλαντος and for female Παλλάς, gen. Παλλάδος) may refer to the following figures:

 Pallas (Titan), the son of Crius and Eurybia, brother of Astraeus and Perses, and husband of Styx.
Pallas (Giant), a son of Uranus and Gaia, killed and flayed by Athena.
 Pallas, daughter of Triton.
 Pallas (son of Lycaon), a teacher of Athena.
 Pallas (son of Pandion), the son of Pandion II, king of Athens, and father of the 50 Pallantides.
 Pallas, the father of Euryalus by Diomede.
 Pallas (son of Evander), a prominent character in the Aeneid.
 Pallas Athena, one of the epithets of the goddess Athena.

Notes

References 

 Apollodorus, The Library with an English Translation by Sir James George Frazer, F.B.A., F.R.S. in 2 Volumes, Cambridge, MA, Harvard University Press; London, William Heinemann Ltd. 1921. ISBN 0-674-99135-4. Online version at the Perseus Digital Library. Greek text available from the same website.
 Gaius Julius Hyginus, Fabulae from The Myths of Hyginus translated and edited by Mary Grant. University of Kansas Publications in Humanistic Studies. Online version at the Topos Text Project.
 Hesiod, Theogony from The Homeric Hymns and Homerica with an English Translation by Hugh G. Evelyn-White, Cambridge, MA.,Harvard University Press; London, William Heinemann Ltd. 1914. Online version at the Perseus Digital Library. Greek text available from the same website.
 Publius Vergilius Maro, Aeneid. Theodore C. Williams. trans. Boston. Houghton Mifflin Co. 1910. Online version at the Perseus Digital Library.
 Publius Vergilius Maro, Bucolics, Aeneid, and Georgics. J. B. Greenough. Boston. Ginn & Co. 1900. Latin text available at the Perseus Digital Library.

Characters in Greek mythology